The following is a timeline of the history of the city of Brazzaville, Republic of the Congo.

19th century

 1880 - Teke trading site at Pool Malebo "ceded...to French explorer Pierre Savorgnan de Brazza;" named Ncouna.
 1884 - Ncouna renamed Brazzaville.
 1886 - Catholic Apostolic Vicariate of French Congo founded.
 1892 - Sacred Heart Cathedral built.
 1893 - Palais Épiscopal built.(fr)

20th century
 1901 -  built.
 1910 - Brazzaville becomes part of colonial French Equatorial Africa.
 1911 - White residential Poto-Poto neighborhood established.
 1912 - Town hall built.(fr)
 1927 - Stade Marchand (stadium) opens.
 1929 - Urban plan created.(fr)
 1930 - Activist André Matsoua imprisoned; unrest ensues.
 1931 - Poste Centrale (post office) built.(fr)
 1932 - Gare ferroviaire (train station) built.
 1934 - Congo–Ocean Railway (Pointe-Noire-Brazzaville) begins operating.
 1940
 Brazzaville becomes capital of government-in-exile of France (Free France) during World War II.
 October: De Gaulle visits city.
 1943
 Bacongo arrondissement created.
  (church) construction begins.
 1944
 Brazzaville Zoo opens.
 January: Meeting of government-in-exile of France held in Brazzaville.
 1945 - Population: 50,000 (approximate).
 1948 - Victor Schoelcher monument erected.
 1951 -  founded.
 1953 - Vog cinema built.(fr)
 1955 - Palais de Justice (courthouse) built.(fr)
 1956 - 18 November: Moyen-Congo municipal elections, 1956 held; Fulbert Youlou becomes mayor.
 1958 - Population: 100,000 (approximate).
 1959 - Makélékélé and Ouenzé arrondissements created.
 1960 - City becomes capital of independent Republic of the Congo.
 1961 - Population: 136,200.
 1962 - Télé Congo (television) begins broadcasting from Brazzaville.
 1963 - City hall built.(fr)
 1965
 Stade de la Révolution (stadium) opens.
 July: 1965 All-Africa Games held in Brazzaville.
 1970
 Talangaï neighborhood created.
 Population: 200,000 (approximate).
 1971 - University of Brazzaville and Lycée Français Saint-Exupéry de Brazzaville (school) founded.
 1975 - Sister/twin city agreement signed with Dresden, Germany.
 1976 - Development Bank of the Central African States branch in business.
 1977 - 18 March: Assassination of president Ngouabi.
 1980
 5 May: Catholic pope visits city.
 Commune of Brazzaville detaches from the Pool Department.
 Population: 422,000 (approximate).
 1984 - Population: 596,200.
 1986 - Nabemba Tower built.
 1987
 April: 1987 Central African Games held in city.
 Meeting of the Association Internationale des Maires Francophones held in city.
 1989 - AS Police (football club) formed.
 1990
 Mfilou arrondissement officially established.
 Population: 760,300 (estimate).
 1994 -  built.
 1996 - Population: 976,806 (estimate).
 1997 - City taken by pro-Sassou Nguesso forces during the Republic of the Congo Civil War (1997–99).

21st century
 2001 - December: Trial of former president Lissouba held in city.
 2002
 June: "Government troops battle Ninja rebels in Brazzaville."
 Population: 1,242,857 (estimate).
 2003 - Hugues Ngouelondélé becomes mayor.
 2004 - July: 2004 African Championships in Athletics held in city.
 2005 -  (music festival) begins.
 2006 - Mausolée de Pierre Savorgnan de Brazza (memorial) erected.(fr)
 2009 - 26 August: Airplane crash occurs.
 2010 - Maya-Maya Airport new terminal opens.
 2011
  and Madibou arrondissements created.
  active.
 2012
 4 March: Brazzaville arms dump blasts.
 30 November: Airplane crash occurs.
 2015
 Kintélé Sports Complex, Palais des Sports, and Stade Municipal de Kintélé (stadium) open.
 4–19 September: 2015 African Games held in Brazzaville.
 27 September: Political protest.
 October: Political protest; crackdown.
 Port Authority Headquarters building constructed.
 2016 - April: Post-election unrest.
 2017
 August: Christian Roger Okemba becomes mayor.
 Long-planned project to build a Brazzaville-Kinshasa Bridge reactivated.

See also
 Brazzaville history
 List of mayors of Brazzaville
 Timeline and history of Kinshasa, Democratic Republic of the Congo (city across Congo River from Brazzaville)

References

This article incorporates information from the French Wikipedia and Spanish Wikipedia.

Bibliography

in English
 Martin, Phyllis 1995, Leisure and Society in Colonial Brazzaville, Cambridge: Cambridge University Press.
 
 
  

in French

External links

  (Bibliography)
   (Bibliography of open access  articles)
 Items related to Brazzaville, various dates (via Europeana)
 Items related to Brazzaville, various dates (via Digital Public Library of America)

History of Brazzaville
Republic of the Congo history-related lists
Brazzaville
Brazzaville